The  is a Cryptomeria (Sugi) tree at Yamanaka Onsen in Kaga, Ishikawa Prefecture, Japan. One of the four trees believed to be sacred in the precincts of the Sugawara Shrine, it has received the distinction of designation as a Special Natural Monument from the Agency for Cultural Affairs of Japan.

In 1928, Professor Manabu Miyoshi  of Tokyo Imperial University estimated the age of the tree to be 2,300 years.

Jōmon period artifacts unearthed near the shrine establish that human habitation predates recorded history. Warriors including members of the Taira, Minamoto, Asakura, and the  clan are said to have come to the shrine. In 1947, on the occasion of the second National Sports Festival of Japan (held in Ishikawa Prefecture), Emperor Shōwa visited the great sugi.

Sources
This article incorporates material from the article 栢野大杉 (Kayano Ōsugi) in the Japanese Wikipedia, retrieved on December 9, 2007.

See also 
 Jōmon Sugi
 List of individual trees
 List of oldest trees
 List of records of Japan

External links
The Great Cedar of Kayano Fauna and Flora, Ishikawa Prefecture

Individual conifers
Tourist attractions in Ishikawa Prefecture
Natural monuments of Japan
Jōmon period
Individual trees in Japan
Oldest trees